Baron Ferrers of Groby (or Baron Ferrers de Groby) was a title in the Peerage of England. It was created by writ on 29 December 1299 when William Ferrers, 1st Baron Ferrers of Groby was summoned to parliament. He was the son of Sir William de Ferrers, Knt., of Groby, Leicestershire, (d.1287) by his first wife Anne Durward, 2nd daughter of Alan Durward and his wife Margery of Scotland, and grandson of William de Ferrers, 5th Earl of Derby. The first Baron was married to Ellen de Menteith, daughter of Alexander, Earl of Menteith. In 1475 the eighth baron was created the Marquess of Dorset, and the barony in effect merged with the marquessate. It was forfeited along with the marquessate when the third marquess was attainted in 1554.

Barons Ferrers of Groby (1300)
William Ferrers, 1st Baron Ferrers of Groby (1272–1325)
Henry Ferrers, 2nd Baron Ferrers of Groby (1303–1343)
William Ferrers, 3rd Baron Ferrers of Groby (1333–1372)
Henry Ferrers, 4th Baron Ferrers of Groby (1356–1388)
William Ferrers, 5th Baron Ferrers of Groby (1373–1445)
Elizabeth Ferrers, 6th Baroness Ferrers of Groby (1419–1483)
Edward Grey, 6th Baron Ferrers of Groby (c. 1415–1457) was summoned to parliament in right of his wife from 14 December 1446 to 26 May 1455 (women were not permitted to attend in their own right)
John Bourchier, 6th Baron Ferrers of Groby (died 1495), second husband of the 6th Baroness, also held the title in right of his wife from 1462 to her death in 1483
Thomas Grey, 1st Marquess of Dorset (1451–1501) (created Marquess of Dorset, 1475), was the son of Sir John Grey of Groby, who was the son of the 6th Baroness and her first husband
Thomas Grey, 2nd Marquess of Dorset (1472–1530) was summoned to parliament as Baron Ferrers of Groby in 1509
Henry Grey, 1st Duke of Suffolk (1517–1554)

The barony was forfeit in 1554, when the Duke of Suffolk was tried for high treason and executed.

Barons Grey of Groby
Henry Grey (c. 1547–1614), nephew of Henry Grey Duke of Suffolk, was created Baron Grey of Groby, 21 July 1603.
Henry Grey, 2nd Baron Grey of Groby (c. 1600–1673) (created Earl of Stamford in 1628)

For further holders of the title see Earl of Stamford

References

Douglas Richardson & Kimball G. Everingham, Plantagenet Ancestry: A Study in Colonial and Medieval Families, p. 359

 
1299 establishments in England
1554 disestablishments in England
Forfeited baronies in the Peerage of England
Noble titles created in 1299